Sri Potti Sriramulu bus station is a bus station located in Palakollu city of the Indian state of Andhra Pradesh. It is owned by Andhra Pradesh State Road Transport Corporation. This is one of the major bus stations in the district, with services to all towns and villages in the district and also to nearby cities in the state.

Gallery

References

Bus stations in Andhra Pradesh
Palakollu
Buildings and structures in West Godavari district
Transport in West Godavari district
Transport in Palakollu
Buildings and structures in Palakollu